Míriam Rodríguez González (born 18 November 1994), commonly known as Kuki, is a Spanish footballer who plays as a forward for Alhama CF in the Primera División.

Club career
Kuki started her career at Talavera.

References

External links
Profile at La Liga

1994 births
Living people
Women's association football forwards
Spanish women's footballers
People from Talavera de la Reina
Sportspeople from the Province of Toledo
Footballers from Castilla–La Mancha
Atlético Madrid Femenino players
Real Betis Féminas players
Fundación Albacete players
SD Eibar Femenino players
Primera División (women) players
Segunda Federación (women) players
Alhama CF players